Live and Die in Afrika is the third studio album by Kenyan afro-pop band Sauti Sol. It was released online on 21  November 2015 under their imprint label Sauti Sol Entertainment as a self-produced work by Sauti Sol. The band allowed fans to download the album free of charge from their website.

Track list
"Sura Yako" (3:59)
"Live and Die in Afrika" (3:12)
"Say Yeah" (3:46)
"Isabella" (3:31)
"It's Okay" (3:33)
"Nishike" (4:05)
"Dollar Dollar" (3:43)
"Still the One" (4:26)
"Kiss Me" (3:57)
"Nerea" (feat. Amos and Josh) (3:25)
"Kuliko Jana" (feat. Aaron Rimbui) (5:29)
"Sambo Party" (3:39)
"Nipe Nikupe" (3:55)
"Shake Yo Bam Bam" (3:19)
"Relax" (3:20)

2015 albums
Sauti Sol albums
Albums produced by Sauti Sol
Swahili-language albums